This is a list of games for the Sony PlayStation video game system, organized alphabetically by name. There are often different names for the same game in different regions.

The final licensed PlayStation game released in Japan (not counting re-releases) was Black/Matrix 00 on May 13, 2004; counting re-releases, the final licensed game released in Japan was Strider Hiryū on October 24, 2006. The final licensed game released in North America was FIFA Football 2005 on October 12, 2004, and the final licensed game released in Europe was Moorhuhn X on July 20, 2005. Additionally, homebrew games were created using the Sony PlayStation Net Yaroze.

Games list (A–L)

There are currently  games across both this page (A to L) and the remainder of the list from M to Z.

For a chronological list, click the sort button in any of the available region's column. Games dated December 3, 1994 (JP), September 9, 1995 (NA), September 29, 1995 (EU), and November 15, 1995 (AU) are launch titles of each region respectively.

Applications List (A-L)

Bundles List (A-L)

Notes

See also
 List of PlayStation games (M–Z)

References

1
 
PlayStation (A-L)